San Martino was the name of at least two ships of the Italian Navy and may refer to:

 , a  launched in 1863 and stricken in 1903
 , a  launched in 1920, seized by Germany in 1943 being renamed TA17 and scuttled in 1944

Italian Navy ship names